Aurora Walker García (1904–1964) was a Mexican film actress. She appeared in more than a hundred and twenty films during her career. She was married to Mexican actor Julio Taboada until her death (suicide by electrocution) 2 January 1964. Their son is Mexican movie writer and director Carlos Enrique Taboada.

References

1904 births
1964 deaths
Mexican film actresses
20th-century Mexican actresses
Actresses from Mexico City